Through the Wrong Door is a 1919 American silent romantic comedy film directed by Clarence G. Badger and starring Madge Kennedy, John Bowers, Herbert Standing, J.B. Manly, and Bob Kortman. It is based on a story The Wrong Door by Jesse Lynch Williams. The film was released by Goldwyn Pictures on July 20, 1919.

Plot

Cast
Madge Kennedy as Isabel Carter
John Bowers as Burt Radcliffe
Herbert Standing as Haskell Carter
J.B. Manly as Gerald Hopkins
Bob Kortman as James (as Robert Kortman)
Kate Lester as Mrs. Carter
Beulah Peyton as Mrs. Lippin
Betty Schade as Vera Lippin

Preservation
The film is now considered lost.

References

External links

1919 romantic comedy films
American romantic comedy films
American silent feature films
American black-and-white films
Goldwyn Pictures films
Lost American films
1919 lost films
Lost romantic comedy films
1910s American films
Silent romantic comedy films
Silent American comedy films